Brachys aerosus is a species of metallic wood-boring beetle in the family Buprestidae. It is found in North America.

Subspecies
These two subspecies belong to the species Brachys aerosus:
 Brachys aerosus aerosus
 Brachys aerosus rufescens Nicolay & Weiss

References

Further reading

 
 
 

Buprestidae
Articles created by Qbugbot
Beetles described in 1845